Daniel Travis (born March 10, 1968) is an American actor.

Travis was born and raised in Clarkston, Michigan. He received a BFA in theater from Miami University in Oxford, Ohio. He went on to receive an MFA at The Mason Gross School of the Arts at Rutgers University. His early work was on the stage, playing John Buchanan in Summer and Smoke, The Earl of Richmond in Richard III and Paul in Barefoot in the Park.

In 2001, Travis made his small-screen debut with guest appearances on the short-lived television show The Education of Max Bickford, starring Richard Dreyfuss. Without ever having appeared in a film, Travis made his big-screen debut in a starring role in Open Water, about a couple who go scuba diving and are left behind in the ocean by accident while on an organized dive.

Most recently, Travis starred in the Subaru television commercial, Ricky.

Filmography

External links

1968 births
American male film actors
Male actors from Michigan
People from Clarkston, Michigan
Living people